In cryptography, FourQ is an elliptic curve developed by Microsoft Research. It is designed for key agreements schemes (elliptic-curve Diffie–Hellman) and digital signatures (Schnorr), and offers about 128 bits of security. It is equipped with a reference implementation made by the authors of the original paper. The open source implementation is called FourQlib and runs on Windows and Linux and is available for x86, x64, and ARM. It is licensed under the MIT License and the source code is available on GitHub.

Its name is derived from the four dimensional Gallant–Lambert–Vanstone scalar multiplication, which allows high performance calculations. The curve is defined over a two dimensional extension of the prime field defined by the Mersenne prime .

History 
The curve was published in 2015 by Craig Costello and Patrick Longa from Microsoft Research on ePrint.

The paper was presented in Asiacrypt in 2015 in Auckland, New Zealand, and consequently a reference implementation was published on Microsoft's website.

There were some efforts to standardize usage of the curve under IETF; these efforts were withdrawn in late 2017.

Mathematical properties 
The curve is defined by a twisted Edwards equation

In order to avoid small subgroup attacks, all points are verified to lie in an N-torsion subgroup of the elliptic curve, where N is specified as a 246-bit prime dividing the order of the group.

Cryptographic properties

Security 
The currently best known discrete logarithm attack is the generic Pollard's rho algorithm, requiring about  group operations on average. Therefore, it typically belongs to the 128 bit security level.

In order to prevent timing attacks, all group operations are done in constant time, i.e. without disclosing information about key material.

Efficiency 

Hence, for a given  we may write

If we find small , we may compute  quickly by utilizing the implied equation

Babai rounding technique is used to find small .

Moreover, as the characteristic of the field is a Mersenne prime, modulations can be carried efficiently.

Both properties (four dimensional decomposition and Mersenne prime characteristic), alongside usage of fast multiplication formulae (extended twisted Edwards coordinates), make FourQ the currently fastest elliptic curve for the 128 bit security level.

Uses 

FourQ is implemented in the cryptographic library CIRCL, published by Cloudflare.

See also 
 Elliptic-curve cryptography
 Curve25519
 Curve448

References

External links 
 Reference implementation by Microsoft

Elliptic curve cryptography
Microsoft free software
Software using the MIT license